The 1987 Mid-Eastern Athletic Conference men's basketball tournament took place March 5–7, 1987, at Greensboro Coliseum in Greensboro, North Carolina.  defeated , 79–58 in the championship game, to win its sixth consecutive MEAC Tournament title – all against Howard in the championship game.

The Aggies earned an automatic bid to the 1987 NCAA tournament as a No. 15 seed in the Southeast region.

Format
Seven of nine conference members participated, with play beginning in the quarterfinal round. Teams were seeded based on their regular season conference record.

Bracket

* denotes overtime period

References

MEAC men's basketball tournament
1986–87 Mid-Eastern Athletic Conference men's basketball season
MEAC men's basketball tournament